Music Magic is a 2013 Indian Telugu-language musical drama film written and directed by Manthrakshar DS and produced by Paleem Srikanth Reddy under the banner of Palred Media & Entertainment Pvt. LTD. It was released on 20 September 2013.

Cast 
 Rahul
 Kimaya Bhattacharya
 Trinath
 Henna Chopra
 M. S. Narayana
 Thagubothu Ramesh
 Dhanraj
 L. B. Sriram
 Madhumani

Soundtrack 
The film's music composed by Joseph Sunder and Padmanadham. The film has 13 songs.

Reception 
The film was reviewed in Full Hyderabad by Kritika Deval, who criticised the script and the acting, commenting that the film "looks and feels exactly like something a media student would make while aiming for the bare minimum of marks". It was also reviewed in Times of India, whose reviewer gave it an overall score of 2.5 out of 5.

References

External links 
 

2013 films
2010s Telugu-language films
Indian romantic musical films
Indian rock music films